This is a list of airports in Washington (a U.S. state), grouped by type and sorted by location. It contains all public-use and military airports in the state. Some private-use and former airports may be included where notable, such as airports that were previously public-use, those with commercial enplanements recorded by the FAA or airports assigned an IATA airport code.

Airports

See also 
 Essential Air Service
 Washington World War II Army Airfields

References 

Federal Aviation Administration (FAA):
 FAA Airport Data (Form 5010) from National Flight Data Center (NFDC), also available from AirportIQ 5010
 National Plan of Integrated Airport Systems (2017–2021), released September 2016
 Passenger Boarding (Enplanement) Data for CY 2016 (final), released October 2017

Washington State Department of Transportation (WSDOT):
 All Washington State Airports (clickable map, each region has lists and links)
 
 Airport Directory (list)
 Washington State Airport Reference Guide (list and links to PDFs)
 WSDOT-Managed Airports (list and map)

Other sites used as a reference when compiling and updating this list:
 Aviation Safety Network – used to check IATA airport codes
 Great Circle Mapper: Airports in Washington – used to check IATA and ICAO airport codes
 Abandoned & Little-Known Airfields: Washington State – used for information on former airports

 
Washington
Airports
Airports